Philip Coppens (25 January 1971 – 30 December 2012) was a Belgian author, radio host, and commentator whose writings, speeches and television appearances focused on areas of fringe science and alternative history.

Coppens was born in Sint-Niklaas, Belgium. He was a cohost of the Spirit Revolution radio show, his writing was featured in Nexus and Atlantis Rising magazines, and he appeared in 56 episodes of the History Channel's Ancient Aliens television series.

He was married to Kathleen McGowan on 22 September 2011. He died a year later on 30 December 2012 in Los Angeles, California, of angiosarcoma.

Career
Philip Coppens started his writing career as an investigative journalist, covering intelligence activities and politics. In 1995, he was a co-founder of Frontier 2000 (later called Frontier Magazine), a periodical with a circulation centered primarily in the Benelux countries. In 1999, he served as the primary researcher for The Stargate Conspiracy, a book about ancient Egypt and the degree to which its history has a continuing influence on contemporary politics and politicians, with particular focus on the CIA's remote-viewing program Stargate Project. 
 
Coppens' second book, The Canopus Revelation (2004), questioned the assumption that ancient Egyptians associated their god Osiris with the constellation of Orion. Instead he proposed Canopus, the second brightest star in the night-time sky. He appeared at Quest Conference 2005 to give a presentation on this idea.

In Servants of the Grail (2009), Coppens suggested real-life counterparts for the characters in Chrétien de Troyes' Perceval, the Story of the Grail. These included the identification of Rotrou III, Count of Perche with Perceval. Also in 2009, he contributed a chapter to Ancient Code: Are You Ready for the Real 2012?, entitled "Ancient Inroads Towards a New Age".

From 2010 to 2012, Coppens was a frequent contributor to the History Channel's Ancient Aliens series. Nigerian journalist J.K. Obatala, writing about a month after Coppens' death, described him as an "ancient alien buff." Obatala credited Coppens with helping to debunk a claim that the Dogon Ayantu (spiritual leaders) of Mali had astronomical knowledge they could only have obtained from visitors from Sirius – in an article entitled "Dogon Shame." In this article, (originally published in Fortean Times), Coppens stated "it seems that Griaule, a scientist, wanted to attribute to earlier civilisations more knowledge than they actually possessed."

In October 2012, he was a featured presenter at Intrepid Magazine's Paradigm Symposium.

A eulogy for Coppens, published in Intrepid's January print edition, included a quotation from Coppens' final post to his personal blog: "I was diagnosed with an extremely rare case of cancer, angiosarcoma, which affects less than 200 people in the U.S. (each year). Each case is almost by default unique… and so I found that the man who normally studies anomalies, has become a medical enigma as well." Roughly a fortnight later, Coppens died.

Bibliography

References

External links
, last archived version by the Wayback Machine of the Internet Archive, 2 January 2018

Full text of Intrepid Magazine's eulogy for Filip Coppens
Articles by Philip Coppens in Nexus
UFOs in Florida perform for the passing of Philip Coppens Bennett, Mary Alice, UFO Digest, 7 March 2013.

1971 births
2012 deaths
People from Sint-Niklaas
Belgian journalists
Male journalists
Belgian radio presenters
Belgian non-fiction writers
Belgian male writers
Belgian expatriates in the United Kingdom
Belgian expatriates in the United States
Deaths from angiosarcoma
Ancient astronauts proponents
Deaths from cancer in California
Burials at Forest Lawn Memorial Park (Glendale)